K21GE-D is a low-power television station serving Camp Verde, Arizona. It broadcasts on digital channel 21 from its transmitter located on Squaw Peak south of town, and is locally owned by The Camp Verde TV Club. The station broadcasts programming from Three Angels Broadcasting Network, or 3ABN, a Christian television network.

History
An original construction permit was granted to The Verde Valley TV Club (now Camp Verde TV Club) on April 30, 1979 to build a low-power television station K61BG on channel 61 to serve Camp Verde. It was intended to be a translator for KPHO-TV in Phoenix. The station was licensed on February 24, 1982. In 2001, the FCC granted the station permission to move to channel 21, as it was necessary to abandon channel 61, which was in the 700 MHz band that the FCC was planning to auction off for other purposes. In September 2004, the station was licensed as K21GE.

The station was licensed to change from analog to digital operation effective January 14, 2022, changing its call sign to K21GE-D

References

External links
 3ABN official site
 

21GE-D
Religious television stations in the United States
Three Angels Broadcasting Network
Television channels and stations established in 1982
1982 establishments in Arizona
Low-power television stations in the United States